Viktor Gutić (23 December 1901 – 20 February 1947) was a Croatian army colonel who was an Ustaše commissioner for Banja Luka and the Grand Prefect of Pokuplje in the Independent State of Croatia (NDH) during World War II. He was responsible for the persecution of Serbs, Jews and Roma in the Bosanska Krajina region of Bosnia between 1941 and 1945, and reported to the principal commissioner for Bosnia and Herzegovina, Jure Francetić.

As commissioner, Gutić was responsible for organising Ustaše camps and centres in the region and appointing their staff. He fled to Austria and Italy following the collapse of the NDH in 1945 and was arrested in Venice and taken to a camp in Grottaglie before being extradited to Yugoslavia in early 1946. He was sentenced to death in Sarajevo and executed in February 1947 in Banja Luka.

Early life
Viktor Gutić was born in Banja Luka on 23 December 1901. He became a member of the regional Croatian Peasant Party (HSS) and secretary of the party's local branch following the creation of the Kingdom of Serbs, Croats and Slovenes in 1918 and later opened a law firm in the city after finishing his doctoral thesis. He was a founder of the Croatian National Youth (Hrvatska nacionalna omladina, HANAO) and joined Ante Trumbić's Croatian Federalist Peasant Party (Hrvatska federalistička seljačka stranka, HFSS) in 1925. He became an Ustaše sympathizer in the early 1930s and began supporting the ideology of fascist leader Ante Pavelić. Gutić's political beliefs led several conviction, but mostly on fines for distributing Ustasha leaflets. In 1932 he was sentenced to 15 months of jail Sremska Mitrovica prison. Following his release from prison, he began organizing the first Ustaše movements on the territory of the Vrbas Banovina.

During the Axis invasion of Yugoslavia in April 1941, Gutić was recruited as reserve lieutenant in a rear unit in Bihać area. Upon hearing Slavko Kvaternik's proclamation on the establishment of the Axis puppet state, the Independent State of Croatia on April 10, he deserted the following day and went to Zagreb.

World War II

Creation of the NDH and ethnic cleansing operations
Gutić became the Ustaše commissioner (stožernik) on the territory of the dissolved Vrbas Banovina shortly after the creation of the Independent State of Croatia (Nezavisna Država Hrvatska, NDH) in April 1941. On 23 April, he ordered that all Serbs and Montenegrins then living in the Bosanska Krajina that had been born in Serbia or Montenegro were to leave the area within five days. This order was promulgated in the local "Croatian Frontier" newspaper.

Speaking to friars at the Franciscan friary at Petrićevac on 12 May, Gutić stated that "every Croat who today takes the side of our former enemies is not only not a good Croat but an enemy and saboteur of our planned and well-thought-out blueprint for the purification of Croatia from all unwanted elements." At a rally on 28 May, he announced his intention to kill the entire Serb population over the age of 15 in the Bosanska Krajina and was quoted saying: "These Serbian Gypsies will be sent to Serbia, part by trains and part through the Sava River — without boats. These unwanted elements will be rooted out by erasing their traces and the only thing that will remain will be the evil memory of them. All Serbian pests older than 15 will be killed and their children will be put to monasteries and turned into good Catholics."

He stated that he had received orders from the highest ranking Ustaše authorities to ethnically cleanse Bosanska Krajina of non-Croats. According to author Richard West, Gutić was one of the first Ustaša on record to use the term "cleansing" (čišćenje) as a euphemism for mass murder. Referring to Serbs at an Ustaše rally in Sanski Most on 30 May, he was quoted saying:

He complained he was angry at not having seen the bodies of Serbs hanging from trees and streetlamps while travelling through Prijedor and other towns in the region before saying that "if, by some mishap, Yugoslavia were reintegrated, at least we [Ustaše] would have reduced the statistical numbers [of Serbs] in favour of the Croats." He was one of the main organisers of the massacres of Serbs that occurred in Bosanska and was responsible for organising Ustaše camps and centres and appointing their staff.

Commissioner of Banja Luka
Gutić became the commissioner of the Sana–Luka–Krbava–Psat region on 6 June 1941. As commissioner, he strived to transform Banja Luka "from a small regional town into a real city of the future" through the construction of new roads and railway lines, the redesign of streets and the creation of a public building program. He stated that he wanted the town to become the new Croatian capital and in order for this to occur it would need to "rid [itself] of all the customs that left the impression that [it] was a medieval casaba — a common eastern-Balkan small town that in no ways belongs in the European milieu."

Gutić had strict new laws introduced in the city and ordered that heavy sentences be imposed for acts such as public intoxication. In August, he ordered the destruction of a damaged Serbian Orthodox cathedral—which he called a "former Greek Eastern" "house of spite"—for "aesthetic" reasons and so that a statue of Croatian politician Ante Starčević could be constructed in its place. He was named Grand Prefect (veliki župan) of northwestern Bosnia later that month and was assigned to work for the Ministry of the Interior (Ministarstvo unutarnjih poslova, MUP) in Zagreb.

Although Serbs were Gutić's main targets, the Ustaše in Banja Luka also persecuted the city's Bosnian Muslims. This created a power struggle between Gutić's dominant Ustaše faction and the city's Muslim Ustaše. In October 1941, Gutić's men murdered a local Muslim hodža, causing 500 people to take to the streets in protest. On 8 November, Gutić banned the wearing of veils by Muslim women, prompting local Muslim leaders to issue the Banja Luka Muslim Resolution of 22 November 1941. In January and February 1942, Gutić brought a battalion of Ustaše from Herzegovina to Banja Luka and had them carry out atrocities in surrounding Serb villages. These massacres were so brutal that they reportedly disgusted even local Ustaše officials. At one point, local prison guards and members of the Croatian Home Guard intervened to prevent Gutić's men from massacring a group of political prisoners in Banja Luka's "Black House" prison. In March 1942, Banja Luka mayor Hakija Bešlagić resigned in protest against Gutić's actions.

Prefect of Pokuplje, retreat and death
Gutić was named Grand Prefect of the grand župa of Pokuplje in Karlovac in March 1942 and began expelling the Serb population there, prompting the Germans to warn him against such actions. He was promoted to the rank of colonel within the Croatian Armed Forces in March 1943, having previously not held any official military rank. He took part in the Independent State of Croatia evacuation to Austria in 1945, and from there fled to Italy. In Venice he was recognized, arrested, and taken to a camp in Grottaglie. During his captivity, he was in the presence of Slovenian general Leon Rupnik and Chetnik commander Dobroslav Jevđević. He was extradited to Yugoslavia in early 1946, tried for war crimes and sentenced to death in Sarajevo. He was executed in Banja Luka on 20 February 1947.

Notes

References

 
 
 
 
 
 
 
 
 
 
 

1901 births
1946 deaths
People from Banja Luka
Croats of Bosnia and Herzegovina convicted of war crimes
Croatian fascists
Croatian irredentism
People from the Condominium of Bosnia and Herzegovina
Croatian Peasant Party politicians
Ustaše
Croatian collaborators with Nazi Germany
Croatian people of World War II
Holocaust perpetrators in Yugoslavia
Anti-Serbian sentiment
People of the Independent State of Croatia
Executed Yugoslav collaborators with Nazi Germany
Executed Croatian people
People extradited from Italy
People extradited to Yugoslavia
Executed Bosnia and Herzegovina people
Executed mass murderers